The Danish Patent and Trademark Office (DKPTO) is the patent office of Denmark. As of 2013, its Director General was Jesper Kongstad. Sune Stampe Sørensen succeeded Jesper Kongstad in October 2017.

See also 
 Nordic Patent Institute

References

External links

Government agencies of Denmark
Patent offices
Trademark law organizations